Supermodelo 2006 was the first season of Supermodelo. The show took place live once every week, where a public vote decided which one of two nominated contestants would be eliminated from the competition, and the judges would nominate a new set of contestants for elimination. The period in between was pre-recorded, and tracked the progress of all the girls as they received lessons on various aspects of modeling, took part in photo shoot sessions and other fashion related challenges. The goal of the show was to find Spain's next representative in the Elite Model Look contest.

The winner of the competition was 19-year-old María José Gallego from Jaén.

Episodes

Gala 1 
Originally aired: 27 August 2006
 Eliminated: Yurena Álvarez, Yrina Catalá, Ruth Tolín, Reyes Pagador, Paola Ditano, Kim Schmocker & Cristina Cervera
 Nominated for elimination: Mayte Prieto & Odilia Pamela

Gala 2 
Originally aired: 30 August 2006
 Eliminated: Odilia Pamela
 Nominated for elimination: Christel Castaño & Yanira Catalá

Gala 3 
Originally aired: 6 September 2006
 Eliminated: Christel Castaño
 Nominated for elimination: Cristina Palavra & Graciela Tallón

Gala 4 
Originally aired: 13 September 2006
 Eliminated: Cristina Palavra
 Nominated for elimination: Graciela Tallón & Yanira Catalá

Gala 5 
Originally aired: 20 September 2006
 Eliminated: Yanira Catalá
 Nominated for elimination: Elisabeth Kweku & Fina Rodrigo

Gala 6 
Originally aired: 27 September 2006
 Eliminated: Fina Rodrigo
 Nominated for elimination: None

Gala 7 
Originally aired: 4 October 2006
 Nominated for elimination: Laura Beigveder & Malena Costa

Gala 8 
Originally aired: 11 October 2006
 Eliminated: Laura Beigveder
 Nominated for elimination: Graciela Tallón & Malena Costa

Gala 9 
Originally aired: 18 October 2006
 Eliminated: Graciela Tallón
 Nominated for elimination: Laura Negrete & Malena Costa

Gala 10 
Originally aired: 25 October 2006
 Eliminated: Malena Costa
 Nominated for elimination: Elisabeth Kweku & Yasmín García

Gala 11 
Originally aired: 1 November 2006
 Eliminated: Elisabeth Kweku

Final 
Originally aired: 8 November 2006

 4th place: Laura Negrete
 3rd place: Mayte Prieto
 Runner-up: Yasmín García
 Supermodelo 2006: María José Gallego

Contestants
(ages stated are at start of contest)

Semi-finalists

Finalists

Results

 SAFE  The contestant was a candidate for nomination but was saved 
 NOM  The contestant was nominated for elimination 
 ELIM  The contestant was eliminated 
 FINAL  The contestant advanced to the finale
 WINNER  The contestant won the competition

In gala 1, the pool of girls was reduced to the final 13 who would move on to the main competition, before Mayte and Odilia were nominated for elimination.
In gala 7, there was no elimination. All three of the girls who had been nominated for elimination on the previous gala were spared by Judit. 
In gala 12, the final results were based solely on the public vote.

Judges and mentors
 Judit Mascó - host
 Antonia Dell'Atte - model & judge
 Moncho Moreno makeup artist & judge
 Paola Dominguín model & judge
 Cristina Rodríguez - stylist
 Emmanuel Rouzic - photographer
 Jesús Román Martínez - nutritionist
 Jimmy Roca - fitness coach
 Paula Galimbardi - acting coach
 Valerio Pino - runway coach

Viewing figures

References

External links
Official website (archive at the Wayback Machine)
Website of Emmanuel Rouzic, Supermodelo photographer (archive at the Wayback Machine)

2000s Spanish television series